"I See Your Smile" is a single by Cuban American singer and songwriter Gloria Estefan. It was released in February 1993 by Epic Records in Europe, the UK and the US as the third single worldwide, and second in America, from her first compilation album, Greatest Hits (1992). The song was written by Jon Secada and Miguel A. Morejon and produced by Emilio Estefan, Jr., Jorge Casas and Clay Ostwald. It is a Latin-pop ballad about someone who cannot get over their lost love. In the US, the song was released instead of the "Miami Hit Mix / Megamix" medley, which was the second single released in most of the world outside America. The song performed well on the Billboard Hot Adult Contemporary Tracks chart, peaking at number three.

Critical reception
AllMusic editor Jason Birchmeier described "I See Your Smile" as a "beautiful" song. Maryann Scheufele from AXS wrote, "A love song favorite like a great car is remembered. From this 1992 song comes the idea that love and taking chances combine to bring success. Gloria closes her eyes to see the smile of the one she loves and sings about that light in her life. When Gloria sings "I love you" you know she had the support of love when she took a chance." Larry Flick from Billboard stated that "her recognizable alto adds color to a soft and romantic tune, co-penned by protégé Jon Secada. Far more top-40-friendly than the previous "Always Tomorrow"." 

Randy Clark from Cashbox said that "this light, tenderized love ballad should garner decent Adult Contemporary rotation even without the big ballad payoff associated with other slower Estefan hits". Dave Sholin from the Gavin Report commented, "Much more than just an instantly identifiable voice, Gloria's delivery cuts to the soul and meaning of the lyric, in this case written by Jon Secada and his pal Miguel Morejon. Sweetness and sincerity expressed in song." Alan Jones from Music Week rated it three out of five. He wrote that it is "immaculately done, but almost wholly lacking in spark".

Music video
A music video was produced to promote the single. It features movie actor Andy García as a waiter at a restaurant. The video was later published on Estefan's official YouTube channel in September 2010. It has amassed more than 2,3 million views as of October 2021.

Official versions
Original versions
 Album Version – 4:36
 Video Version – 4:13
 Single Version – 4:34
 iTunes Originals Version 2007 – 3:42

Track listings

Charts

Weekly charts

Year-end charts

Release history

References

1990s ballads
1992 songs
1992 singles
1993 singles
Gloria Estefan songs
Songs written by Jon Secada
Epic Records singles
Pop ballads
Songs written by Miguel A. Morejon